A training school, or county training school, was a type of segregated school for African American students found in the United States and Canada. In the Southern United States they were established to educate African Americans at elementary and secondary levels, especially as teachers; and in the Northern United States they existed as educational reformatory schools. A few training schools still exist, however they exist in a different context.

History 

The training school movement began in 1911. The southern training schools were supported by northern philanthropists, roughly from 1910 to 1930. The Slater Fund supported many of the schools. Philanthropic organizations had their own criteria for funding support.

In the segregated Jim Crow South (roughly until the 1950s), schools for African Americans could not be high schools so they were called training schools and “emphasized vocational training and domestic science over academic subjects”. In the south they often served African American students from a large area and were often named county training schools. County training schools were established in Alabama starting in 1915. Training schools addressed the need for larger and better schools to supplement elementary education in small rural schools and helped meet the demand for teachers. They had an agricultural and industrial training ethos and required support and cooperation from local officials. Many schools were eventually renamed, and became high schools until desegregation when many were closed.

Training schools were also established in northern states and in Canada for as educational reformatory schools.

List of U.S. training schools
Listed by southern or northern status, by state, and in alphabetical order by name

Northern states

Connecticut 
 Mansfield Training School and Hospital in Mansfield, Connecticut
 Southbury Training School in Southbury, Connecticut and Roxbury, Connecticut

Iowa 
 Girls State Training School in Toledo, Iowa

Ohio 
 Hillcrest Training School in Cincinnati, Ohio; an extant reform school

Massachusetts 
 Hampden County Training School in Agawam, Massachusetts; established in 1916, a reformatory school for boys 
 Middlesex County Training School in North Chelmsford, Massachusetts; a reform school

Michigan 
 Wayne County Training School in Wayne County, Michigan

New Jersey 
 Vineland Training School in Vineland, New Jersey; first U.S. research facility devoted to studying mental deficiencies was established

North Dakota 
 State Training School in North Dakota; a reform school

Southern states

Alabama 
 Chilton County Training School in Chilton County, Alabama
 Escambia County Training School in Atmore, Alabama
 Lowndes County Training School in Hayneville, Alabama

Arkansas 
 Chicot County Training School in Dermott, Arkansas
 Dallas County Training School in Fordyce, Arkansas; built in 1934 with the Rosenwald Fund, the only high school serving African Americans in a four southern Arkansas counties until 1940
 Fargo Training School in Fargo, Arkansas
 General Education Board Training School in Lafayette County, Arkansas
 Lafayette County Training School in Stamps, Arkansas
 Little River County Training School in Ashdown, Arkansas

Florida 
 Carver Training School in Martin County, Florida
 Dade County Training School in Dade County, Florida; from 1899–1937
 Delray County Training School in Delray Beach, Florida
 Jackson County Training School in Jackson County, Florida
 Lake County Training School in Leesburg, Florida
 Murray Training School in Martin County, Florida
 Stuart Training School in Stuart, Martin County, Florida

Georgia 
 Carroll County Training School in Carrollton, Georgia
 Fayette County Training School in Fayetteville, Georgia

Mississippi 
 Lee County Training School in Tupelo, Mississippi which became Carver High School (Tupelo, Mississippi)
 Oktibbeha County Training School in Starkville, Mississippi
 Pearl River County Training School in Picayune, Mississippi
 Stone County Training School in Wiggins, Mississippi; the first secondary school for Black students in Stone County, Mississippi
 Winston County Training School in Louisville, Mississippi

North Carolina 
 Anderson County Training School in North Carolina
 Berry O’Kelly Training School in Method, North Carolina
 Bladen County Training School in Elizabethtown, North Carolina
 Buncombe County Boys' Training School in Asheville, North Carolina
 Caswell County Training School in Caswell County, North Carolina; from 1933–1969
 Cleveland County Training School in Shelby, North Carolina; a Rosenwald School near Wise, North Carolina
 Franklin County Training School in Louisburg, North Carolina
 Harnett County Training School in Dunn, North Carolina
 Hyde County Training School in Sladesville, Hyde County, North Carolina
 Lee County Training School in Lee County, North Carolina
 Orange County Training School (OCTS) in Chapel Hill, North Carolina; from 1916–1966
Stonewall Jackson Training School in unincorporated Cabarrus County, North Carolina
Warren County Training School in Wise, Warren County, North Carolina; a Rosenwald School
Wilmington Training School in Wilmington, North Carolina where Lewis Thomas Christmas served as principal

Tennessee 
 Bedford County Training School for Negroes in Shelbyville, Tennessee; also named John McAdams High School during its existence
 Chester County Training School in Henderson, Tennessee
 Gibson County Training School in Milan, Tennessee; built in 1926 with financial support from the Rosenwald Fund
 Hardeman County Training School in Whiteville, Tennessee
 Haywood County Training School in Brownsville, Tennessee; which became George Washington Carver High School

Texas 
 Texas State Training School for Girls in Cooke County, Texas

Virginia 
 Albemarle Training School in Charlottesville, Virginia
 Augusta County Training School in Cedar Green, Virginia
 Buckingham Training School in Dillwyn, Virginia; a Rosenwald School
 Greensville County Training School in Emporia, Virginia
 Konnarock Training School in Konnarock, Virginia
 Nansemond County Training School in Suffolk, Virginia
 Princess Anne County Training School in Virginia Beach, Princess Anne County, Virginia

Canada
 New Brunswick Training School a former youth detention centre in Kingsclear, New Brunswick, Canada

See also
 Black school, the history of early Black education in the United States
 General Education Board, a private organization to help support higher education and medical schools in the rural South
 Manual labor college (1825–1860), a type of school that supplemented academics with labor
 Normal school, an educational institution to train teachers
 Training school (United Kingdom)
 List of industrial schools
 Historically Black colleges and universities
 List of historically black colleges and universities
 Rosenwald Schools
 Jeanes Foundation

References

Historically black schools
African Americans and education